The 2019 Columbus Destroyers season was the 11th and last season for the franchise in the Arena Football League, their sixth season in Columbus, and their first season following a 10-year hiatus.  The Destroyers played their home games at Nationwide Arena and were coached by Matthew Sauk for the 2019 season.

Standings

Schedule

Regular season
The 2019 regular season schedule was released on February 13, 2019. All times Eastern.

Game summaries

Roster

References

Columbus Destroyers
Columbus Destroyers seasons
Columbus Destroyers